Tremmen is a village in Brandenburg, Germany, situated in the district of Havelland. It is one of the civil parishes (Ortsteile) of the town of Ketzin.

History
The village was founded in 1161 with the name of Tremene. Until October 26, 2003, when it was merged into Ketzin, it was an autonomous municipality.

Geography
Tremmen is situated in the geographical region of Nauener Platte, not too far from the western borders of Berlin and its metropolitan region and by the road linking Wustermark and Brandenburg an der Havel. It lies 6 km from Ketzin, 5 from Wustermark, 15 from Nauen, 20 from Potsdam and circa 30 from Rathenow.

References

External links

 Official site of Tremmen
 Dorfmuseum Tremmen website

Villages in Brandenburg
Localities in Havelland
Former municipalities in Brandenburg
Populated places established in the 12th century